Manohar N. Vartak (1926–1997) was a Professor Emeritus of Mathematics and Statistics at the Indian Institute of Technology, Mumbai.  Professor Vartak was one of founder members of the Department of Mathematics and the head of the department (1973–1977). He was superannuated in 1986. Vartak was specialized in balanced incomplete block designs, graph theory and operations research.

Vartak received his PhD (1961) in statistics from University of Mumbai under the guidance of professor M. C. Chakrabarti. Vartak guided numerous students for their PhDs.

References

 
  Mathematics Department – I.I.T, Mumbai

Indian combinatorialists
University of Mumbai alumni
Scientists from Mumbai
Academic staff of IIT Bombay
1997 deaths
1926 births
20th-century Indian mathematicians